Luis Paret y Alcázar (11 February 1746 – 14 February 1799) was a Spanish painter of the late-Baroque or Rococo period.

Biography
He was born in Madrid he first trained with Antonio González Velázquez and attended the Academia Real de San Fernando in Madrid, where he won a second prize in a painting contest in 1760, and first prize in 1766. He entered the studio of the French painter Charles de la Traverse, who worked for the Marchese of Ossun, the ambassador of France in Spain. Unfortunately upon returning to Madrid, despite becoming a teacher in the Academia de San Fernando at age 33 years, he mainly received royal commissions to paint and engrave vistas of ports, the Spanish equivalent of vedute, and also of planned works of construction. For some years, he was banished to Puerto Rico, where he trained the painter Jose Campeche. He also painted flowers in still life and genre paintings called bambochadas for their focus on the customs of the underclasses.

Gallery

References

 Scholarly articles about Luis Paret y Alcázar both in web and PDF @ the Spanish Old Masters Gallery

1746 births
1799 deaths
Artists from Madrid
18th-century Spanish painters
18th-century Spanish male artists
Spanish male painters
Spanish Baroque painters
Spanish genre painters